Leiosaurus paronae is a species of lizard in the family Leiosauridae. It is native to Argentina.

References

Leiosaurus
Reptiles described in 1897
Reptiles of Argentina
Reptiles of Brazil
Taxa named by Mario Giacinto Peracca